Friedrich "Fritz" Schedl (born 1903, date of death unknown) was an Austrian sprinter. He competed in the men's 100 metres event at the 1924 Summer Olympics.

References

External links
 

1903 births
Year of death missing
Austrian male sprinters
Olympic athletes of Austria
Athletes (track and field) at the 1924 Summer Olympics